Inside the Moment is the third album by American jazz vocalist and saxophone player Camille Thurman. It was released by Chesky Records on May 19, 2017 and debuted at No. 25 on the Billboard Jazz Albums Chart. The album was recorded live at the Rockwood Music Hall on February 19, 2017. The track "Cherokee" was nominated for an Independent Music Award.

Track listing 

 "The Night Has a Thousand Eyes" – 7:21
 "Sassy's Blues" – 7:40
 "Road Song" – 6:13
 "Detour Ahead" – 7:43
 "Nefertiti" – 7:43
 "A Flower Is a Lovesome Thing" – 7:42
 "Cherokee" – 4:54

Personnel 

 Camille Thurman - Vocals, Tenor Saxophone
 Ben Allison - Bass
 Mark Whitfield - Guitar
 Billy Drummond - Drums
 Jeremy Pelt - Trumpet
 David Chesky - Producer
 Norman Chesky - Producer
 Nicholas Prout - Recording, Editing, Mastering
 Mor Mezrich - Second Engineer
 Janelle Costa - Assistant Engineer

References

Chesky Records live albums
Jazz albums by American artists